The National Association of Collegiate Directors of Athletics (NACDA) is a professional organization for college and university athletic directors in the United States. NACDA boasts a membership of more than 6,100 individuals and more than 1,600 institutions throughout the United States, Canada and Mexico. Members include athletics directors, associate and assistant athletics directors, conference commissioners and affiliate individuals or corporations.

History
The National Association of Collegiate Directors of Athletics was founded in 1965. It had its origins at the First and Second National Conferences on Athletic Administration in Colleges and Universities, held in Louisville, Kentucky in 1959 and 1962. At the third conference, in 1965, in Washington, D.C., NACDA was officially founded and the Association held its inaugural Convention in 1966.

Organization
NACDA is governed by a group of Officers and executive committee members. The Officers consist of a President, a 1st, 2nd and 3rd Vice President and a Secretary. The Finance-Management Committee consists of the current Officers and Past Presidents who conduct the finances of the Association. The executive committee includes eight representatives each from the college and University Divisions, four from the Junior/Community College Division and several At-Large members. This latter group includes five representatives of affiliated associations/organizations and female representatives from districts which do not have female representation.

Awards

NACDA Directors' Cup
James J. Corbett Memorial Award
NACDA/NIT Athletics Directors Award
Awards for Administrative Excellence
NACDA/USOC Collegiate Olympic Coaches
NACDA/SMI Honorary Degree
NACDA Lifetime Achievement Award
NACDA Merit of Honor Award
Under Armour AD of the Year Award
Special Recognition of Service to NACDA

Hall of fame
See footnote and Hall of fame

Past presidents
The following table lists the past presidents of the NACDA.

See also
College Sports Communicators

References

External links
 
 Long Time Executive Director of NACDA to Receive Sports Academy’s Honorary Doctorate, United States Sports Academy, June 16, 2004

College sports administrator and coach organizations in the United States
Sports organizations established in 1965